Paul Priem (11 March 1893 – 2 August 1943) was a German officer in the Wehrmacht during World War II and a noted member of the German staff at the Colditz Castle POW camp.

During the Greater Poland Uprising of 1918–1919, he fought against the Polish insurrection as a second-lieutenant in the Freikorps. During the 1930s, he was a school headmaster in Leipzig until called up for active service in 1939.

He was subsequently given the post as the Security Officer at Colditz Castle and was known to the prisoners as being one of the more jovial of the Germans; Pat Reid, a successful POW escapee, said he "possessed a rare quality among Germans - a sense of humour". Priem's heavy drinking, however, meant he was called before a medical board and found to be unfit for active service. He returned to teaching, and died from the effects of his drinking in August 1943.

References 

 Eggers, Reinhold (1974), Colditz Recaptured (New English Library).

1893 births
1943 deaths
German Army officers of World War II
Military personnel from Poznań
People from the Province of Posen
Alcohol-related deaths in Germany
German Army personnel of World War I
20th-century Freikorps personnel